Sidescroller usually refers to a side-scrolling video game.

Sidescroller  may also refer to:

 SideScrollers, a graphic novel from Oni Press
 SideScrollers, a podcast on ScrewAttack